Brachycercus harrisella is a species of insect belonging to the family Caenidae.

It is native to Europe and Northern America.

Synonym:
 Brachycercus pallidus Tshernova, 1928

References

Mayflies